165 Port and Maritime Regiment RLC is an Army Reserve regiment of the British Army's Royal Logistic Corps.

History
The regiment was formed in Grantham as 165 Port Regiment, RLC (Volunteers) in 1995. 266 Squadron was re-formed at Southampton in 2006.

Structure
The current structure is as follows:
 Regimental Headquarters, in Derriford, Plymouth
 142 (Queen's Own Oxfordshire Hussars) Vehicle Squadron RLC - Banbury
 232 (Cornwall) Port Squadron RLC - Bodmin
 264 (Plymouth) Headquarters Squadron RLC - Plymouth (Derriford Army Reserve Centre)
 265 (Devon) Port Squadron RLC - Plymouth (Derriford Army Reserve Centre)
 266 (Southampton) Port Squadron RLC - Southampton (Blighmont Army Reserve Centre) and Isle of Wight (Newport Army Reserve Centre)
 710 (Royal Buckinghamshire Hussars) Operational Hygiene Squadron - Aylesbury

References

External links
Official site

Regiments of the Royal Logistic Corps